In the 1854 Iowa State Senate elections, Iowa voters elected state senators to serve in the fifth Iowa General Assembly. Elections were held for 19 of the state senate's 31 seats. State senators serve four-year terms in the Iowa State Senate.

The general election took place in 1854.

Following the previous election in 1852, Democrats had control of the Iowa Senate with 20 seats to Whigs' 11 seats.

To claim control of the chamber from Democrats, the Whigs needed to net 5 Senate seats.

Democrats maintained control of the Iowa State Senate following the 1854 general election with the balance of power shifting to Democrats holding 17 seats and Whigs having 14 seats (a net gain of 3 seats for Whigs). Democratic Senator Maturin L. Fisher was chosen as the President of the Iowa Senate for the fifth General Assembly, succeeding Democratic Senator William E. Leffingwell in that leadership position.

Summary of Results 
 Note: The holdover Senators not up for re-election are not listed on this table.

Source:

Detailed Results
NOTE: The Iowa General Assembly does not provide detailed vote totals for Iowa State Senate elections in 1854.

See also
 Elections in Iowa

External links
District boundaries for the Iowa Senate in 1854:
Iowa Senate Districts 1852-1855 map

References

Iowa Senate
Iowa
Iowa Senate elections